Criorhina nigriventris  (Walton, 1911), the  Bare-cheeked Bumble Fly, is an uncommon species of syrphid fly observed across the northern United States, the Appalachian Mountains and southern Canada. Hoverflies can remain nearly motionless in flight. The  adults are also known as flower flies for they are commonly found on flowers, from which they get both energy-giving nectar and protein-rich pollen. The larvae of this genus are found in decaying wood.

Distribution
Canada, United States.

References

Eristalinae
Insects described in 1911
Diptera of North America